Spodnje Vrtiče is a dispersed settlement in the western Slovene Hills north of Zgornja Kungota in the Municipality of Kungota in northeastern Slovenia.

References

External links
Spodnje Vrtiče on Geopedia

Populated places in the Municipality of Kungota